Pays de Sault is a small natural region of France in the department of Aude. Geographically, this region is located between 990 and 1310 metres of elevation from the heart of the Pyrenees.

The Pays de Sault region consist in three main geographical places:
 The Roquefortès
 Roquefort-de-Sault
 Rodome
 "Espezel-Belcaire-Camurac

Natural regions of France